The belted wrasse (Stethojulis balteata) is a species of wrasse in the family Labridae, endemic to the Hawaiian Islands. It was originally named Stethojulis axillaris by Quoy and Gaimard in 1824.

Description
The species can easily be identified by its bright colors and distinct pattern. It is a light green color, with blue lines running parallel across its body and an orange spiny dorsal fin. It also has a thicker, orange stripe that runs in between the blue lines, from the pectoral fin to the tail.  As most reef fish, the Belted Wrasse is relatively small, reaching 6 inches (15 centimeters) in length in full maturity. Wrasses are also sequential hermaphrodites, meaning they can change sex during their lifespan.

Distribution and habitat
The belted wrasse is native to the Hawaiian Islands, but can also found in the reefs of the Johnston Atoll, 825 miles from Honolulu. Belted Wrasses are benthopelagic, meaning they live at the bottom of the sea, near corals and algae beds. The Omaka buries itself in sand at night, which is a common pattern seen across Wrasses. They feed on small invertebrates such as bivalves, polychaetes, sipuncula, and gastropods. They may also ingest organic waste from dead crustaceans and fish.

Human use and cultural significance
Although this species may be kept in aquariums, it is highly advised not to. Wrasses are skittery by nature, and they can jump out of an aquarium if left uncovered. The Omaka is not considered a food source, but it may have been for Hawaiians before the arrival of missionaries. Native Hawaiians would typically catch hīnālea by submerging sticks covered in charred oil, which would attract the fish making them easy to catch. Hīnālea were also commonly used as offerings to the gods in ceremonies, although it is not for certain that the omaka was used for this practice.

References

Wikipedia Student Program
Labridae
Fish of Hawaii